is a Japanese academic and historian, and one of Japan's leading scholars of Japanese Buddhism. A member of the advisory board of Nanzan Institute for Religion and Culture's Japanese Journal of Religious Studies, he is also a contributor to the journal itself.

Early life
Sueki's studies at the University of Tokyo were rewarded with a BA in 1973 and an MA in 1975. In 1994, he earned his Ph.D.; and he joined the faculty in the next year.

Career
From 1995 through 2009, Sueki was a professor at the University of Tokyo.  In the Graduate School of Humanities and Sociology, he taught courses about Japanese Buddhism. His primary area of interest is the reconstruction of the intellectual history of Buddhism in Japan from ancient to modern times.

Since 2009, he has been a professor at the International Research Centre for Japanese Studies.

Selected works
In a statistical overview derived from writings by and about Fumihiko Sueki, OCLC/WorldCat encompasses roughly 60+ works in 80+ publications in 3 languages and 500+ library holdings.

 日本仏教史 : 思想史としてのアプローチ (1992)
 観無量寿経 (1992)
 日本仏教思想史論考 (1993)
 禅と思想 (1997)
 鎌倉仏教形成論: 思想史の立場から (1998)
 近代日本の思想再考 (2004)
 明治思想家論 (2004)
 近代日本と仏教 (2004)
 日本宗教史 (2006)
 The Sutra on the Concentration of Sitting Meditation (2009)

Notes

Historians of Japan
Academic staff of the University of Tokyo
University of Tokyo alumni
Living people
1949 births
Japanese scholars of Buddhism